Streptomonospora salina is a bacterium. YIM 90002T is its type strain.

Description
The aerial mycelium of this species is well developed and at maturity forms short chains of spores. Spores in short chains are oval- to rod-shaped and have wrinkled surfaces. The substrate mycelium is branched with non-fragmenting hyphae and forms single oval to round spores borne on sporophores or dichotomously branching sporophores. Single spores and spores in short chains are non-motile.

References

Further reading
Whitman, William B., et al., eds. Bergey's manual® of systematic bacteriology. Vol. 5. Springer, 2012.

External links

LPSN
Type strain of Streptomonospora salina at BacDive -  the Bacterial Diversity Metadatabase

Actinomycetales
Bacteria described in 2001